The Border Service of the Federal Security Service of the Russian Federation (PS FSB Rossii) is a branch of Federal Security Service of Russia tasked with patrol of the Russian border.

The terms Border Service of Russia and Border Force of Russia are also common, while in English, the terms "Border Guards" and "Border Troops" are frequently used to designate this service. The Border service numbers around 170,000 active members, which includes the Russian maritime border guard units (i.e., the coast guard).

History

Tsarist and Imperial Russia

One can trace the origin of the Russian border service to 1571 and the work of Prince Mikhail Vorotynsky (died 1573) and his Great Abatis Border built along the southern boundaries of the Tsardom of Russia in the 16th century.
In 1782 the Empress Catherine II of Russia established Border Customs Guard units, originally manned by Russian Cossacks as well as by low-ranking cavalry troops. In 1810 General Mikhail Barklay de Tolly organized numerous border posts along the entire western Russian border, manned by 11 regiments of Don and Bug Cossacks . Within two years Russian Border Guards became the first to oppose Napoleon's invasion of Russia (June 1812). In 1832 Cossacks and cavalry were replaced by armed customs officials subordinate to the Ministry of Finance in peacetime (in wartime the border guards were automatically transferred to the army). In the same year the government of Emperor Nicholas I established a coast guard – originally to observe coasts of the Black Sea and of the Sea of Azov.

Count Sergei Witte, the Russian Minister of Finance (1892–1903) in the government of Alexander III (reigned 1881–1894), reformed the service on 13 October 1893 into the Independent Border Guards Corps (IBGC – a para-military rather than a civilian organization) headed by an army general and reporting directly to the ministry.

In 1906 about 40,000 soldiers and officers served in the IBGC – maintaining the defence of the lengthy Imperial border. They served in 8 division-sized districts as well as in the Saint Petersburg headquarters unit.

Soviet period

Soviet Border Troops, were the militarized border guard of the Soviet Union, subordinated to its subsequently reorganized state security agency: first to Cheka/OGPU, then to NKVD/MGB and, finally, to KGB. Accordingly, they were known as NKVD Border Troops and KGB Border Troops (with Russian abbreviations - НКВД СССР/- КГБ СССР added on the end of official names). Unlike border guards of many other countries, Soviet Border Troops were a centralized force including also the maritime border guard units (i.e., a coast guard).

Modern period

Following the collapse of the Soviet Union, the Federal Border Guard Service of Russia was created on December 30, 1993 as a separate government agency. The agency retained some old traditions, most notably the dark green-coloured uniform and Border Guards Day (an official holiday commemorated by celebrations of ex-servicemen). The First minister of the FBS (Federal Border Service) was Andrei Nikolayev, a young and outspoken general who later became deputy of the State Duma. Russian Border Guards were also stationed outside of Russia most notably in southern Tajikistan, in order to guard the border with Afghanistan, until summer 2005. On the Afghan-Tajik border on many occasions they were engaged in heavy fighting with drug-traffickers and Islamic extremists.  Armenia's closed border with Turkey and open border with Iran is also still guarded by the Russians. On March 11, 2003, the Russian president Vladimir Putin changed the status of the Border Guard Service from a separate agency into a branch of the Russian Federal Security Service. The current head of the Border Guard Service of Russia is General Vladimir Pronichev. The Border Guard Service of Russia is tasked with a defence of the longest national border in the world.

In April 2012 Vladimir Pronichev announced that the country was planning to build 20 frontier posts in the Arctic region. Reasons for this development can be found in the increased abilities to explore hydrocarbon deposits in the north. It will also give Russia an ability to patrol and service the Northern Sea Route.

In July 2014 Ukraine opened a criminal case against the head of the Border Guard Service Vladimir Kulishov; he was accused of financing “illegal military groups” in Eastern Ukraine who at the time fought against the Ukrainian army.

Mission

Responsibilities of the Border Guard Service of Russia include:

 Defence of the Russian national border, prevention of illegal crossing of the land and sea border by people and goods (smuggling).
 Protection of economic interests of the Russian Federation and its natural resources within land and sea border areas, territorial waters and internal seas, including prevention of poaching and illegal fishing.
 Combat any threats to national security in the border area, including terrorism and foreign infiltration.

Organization

Command
 The head of the Border Service – General of the Army Vladimir Kulishov (Deputy Director of Russia's FSB)
 First Deputy Head of the Border Service – Lieutenant-General Vladimir Rozhkov
 First Deputy Head of the Border Service – the head of the Organizational Department, Colonel-General Mansur Masgutovich Valiev
 Deputy head of Russia's FSB Border Service – the chief international treaty management Lieutenant-General Alexander L. Manilov
 Deputy Chief of the Border Service – Lieutenant-General Victor Trofimovich Trufanov
 Deputy Chief of the Border Service – Maj. Gen. Alexander O. Mizon
 Deputy Chief of the Border Service – Maj. Gen. Nikolai Nikolaevich Rybalkin
 Deputy Chief of the Border Service – Lieutenant General Gennady Semenovich Simuhin

Old FPS structure

FPS Russia, the Federal Border Service (Federal'naya Pogranichnaya Sluzhba), active from 30 December 1994 to 30 June 2003, was headed by a single centralized system, which included:

 Border control;
 Foreign intelligence corps;
 Operational entities engaged in intelligence, counter, operational investigative activities, to ensure its own security system;
 Border guards and other organs of the Border Service, provided by federal law;
 FPS Russia border troops;
 Military educational institutions, vocational education,
 Companies, institutions, and organizations in Russia under the FPS (hereinafter referred to authorities and troops as FPS Russia), according to federal law

Lineup
Changes in the regional structure of the Border Service, instead of ten regional border (see the old structures FPS) for the new scheme includes regional offices of the border (in the federal districts) and 30 border offices. Includes the Maritime Border Guard.

Regional border districts:

 Regional Border Directorate of the Central Federal District
 Regional Border Management for the Southern Federal District
 Regional Border Directorate of the Ural Federal District
 Regional Border Directorate of the Volga Federal District
 Regional Border Directorate for the Siberian Federal District
 North West Regional Border Driectorate
 Arctic regional border directorate
 Regional Border Directorate for the Far Eastern Federal District
 Regional Border Directorate for the North Caucasian Federal District

As adopted by presidential decree No. 457, dated April 23, 2001, the following educational institutions form part of the BS-FSS:

 Border Forces Academy of the BS-FSS
 Military Medical Institute, the Border Service of Russia's FSB in the Nizhny Novgorod State Medical Academy;
 Golitsynsky Military Institute of the Border Service;
 Kaliningrad Military Institute of the Border Service;
 Kurgan Military Institute of the Border Service;
 Moscow Border Institute of the FSB
 Khabarovsk Military Institute of the Border Service;
 The First Cadet Corps of the Border Service

Enterprises, institutions and organizations which are subordinate to the Border Service:

 Medical and health institutions;
 Repair plant;
 Parts logistics, technical, and other support.

Foreign operations

Armenia 
The basis for the deployment of Russian border guards in Armenia is an interstate agreement concluded on September 30, 1992. The border department of the FSB of Russia in Armenia includes four border detachments: one in Gyumri, Armavir, Artashat and Meghri, as well as a separate checkpoint at the Zvartnots International Airport. The maintenance of about 4.5 thousand Russian border guards in Armenia is financed from the budgets of both states. Russian border guards also guard the borders of Armenia with Turkey and Iran.

Tajikistan 
From 1992 to 2005, there was a Group of Russian Border Troops in the Republic of Tajikistan.

Abkhazia 
In Abkhazia, the base of the coast guard patrol ships of the Russian FSB Border Guard Service is located in the seaside town of Ochamchira. The goal is to assist the Abkhaz Navy in ensuring the security of its maritime borders.

Russian Coast Guard

See also
Border Security Zone of Russia
Awards of the Federal Border Service of the Russian Federation
Awards of the Border Guard Service of the Federal Security Service of the Russian Federation

Timeline

 The border and internal troops (Guard) VCHK-OGPU-NKVD-USSR Ministry of Internal Affairs.
 29 September 1918 – The headquarters of the hull forces (internal security) VCHK.
 1 April 1921 – The Office of troops VCHK-OGPU.
 1 December 1922 – The headquarters of the troops OGPU.
 3 October 1923 – Inspektsiya troops GPU – OGPU.
 6 November 1926 – The Directorate of Border Guard Troops and OGPU.
 10 July 1934 – General Directorate of Border and internal security (GUPVO) Soviet NKVD.
 29 September 1938 – General Directorate of Border and Interior Troops (GUPVV) Soviet NKVD.

From 1938 to 1957:

 The Directorate of Border Troops (GUPV)
 The Directorate of troops for the protection of railway facilities
 The Directorate of troops for the protection of critical business industry
 The Directorate escort troops (GUKV)
 General Directorate of Military Supplies (GUVS)
 The main military construction management
 9 June 1956 – GUPVV USSR Ministry of Internal Affairs.
 2 April 1957 – GUPVV USSR Ministry of Internal Affairs was disbanded in connection with the transfer of border troops of the Ministry of Internal Affairs to the Soviet KGB when the Soviet Union SM.

The border troops (Guard):

 28 May 1918 – Border Guard when Narkomate Finance (later - in the military and Narkomate Foreign Trade).
 24 November 1920 – features in the GS VCHK-GPU, then to the CGB GPU and the headquarters of a frontier corps (Border Division) headquarters troops OGPU.
 28 July 1923 – Department of Border Guard GPU, OGPU.
 6 November 1926 – The Directorate of Border Guard Troops and OGPU.
 10 July 1934 – Soviet NKVD GUPVO.
 29 September 1938 – Soviet NKVD GUPVV.
 8 March 1939 – Soviet NKVD GUPV.
 17 October 1949 – GUPV MGB USSR
 14 March 1953 – GUPV USSR Ministry of Internal Affairs
9 Jun, 1956 – based GUPV, GUVKO and MAT USSR Ministry of Internal Affairs was organized by the USSR Ministry of Internal Affairs GUPVV.
 2 April 1957 – GUPV KGB when the Soviet Union SM.
 5 July 1978 – GUPV KGB.
 In December 1991 – after the reorganization of KGB, the General Directorate of Border Troops were abolished and formed the Committee for the Protection of the State border of the Soviet Union with the Joint Command of the border forces led by was assigned to the post of chairman of the Committee - Chief of Soviet border troops.
 In 1992 – a Border troops of the Russian Federation, which have been subordinated to the Ministry of Security.
 In 1993 – Federal Border Service – General Command of Border Troops of Russian Federation with the status of federal ministries.
 In 1994 – renamed the Federal Border Service (FPS Russia).
 4 May 2002 – FPS Russia renamed the Border Service of the Russian Federation, which consists of specially authorized federal executive body for the Border Service (FPS Russia), troops and other organizations.
 11 March 2003 – Vladimir Putin abolished the function of FPS conveyed to the FSB. FPS Russia renamed PS Russia's FSB.

Equipment

Aircraft
Antonov An-26
Ilyushin Il-76
Technoavia SM92 Finist

Helicopter
Mil Mi-8 Hip

References

Sources
Лубянка. Lubyanka. Органы ВЧК-ОГПУ-НКВД-НКГБ-МГБ-МВД-КГБ 1917–1991. Справочник, документы (Международный фонд Демократия, Москва 2003) - Authorities VCHK-OGPU-NKVD-NKGB-MGB-MVD-KGB 1917–1991.  Reference documents (International Fund for Democracy, Moscow 2003)
 Приложение N 2 к Указу Президента Российской Федерации от 19 июля 1997 г. N 732 Annex 2 to N decree of the President of the Russian Federation of 19 Jul, 1997 N 732

External links

 Official website 
 Central Border guard museum 
 Border Guard profile on agentura.ru 
 Russian non-military security forces

Government and politics articles needing translation from Russian Wikipedia
Russia
Military of Russia
Military of the Russian Empire
Borders of Russia
Federal Security Service